Amor de Perdição is a Brazilian telenovela that first aired on TV Cultura in 1965. It is based on the novel of the same name by Portuguese writer Camilo Castelo Branco.

References

External links
 

1965 Brazilian television series debuts
1965 Brazilian television series endings
1965 telenovelas
Amor de Perdição
Brazilian telenovelas
1960s Brazilian television series